Ladies & Gentlemen is a 2015 Telugu film written and directed by P. B. Manjunath, who makes his directorial debut. An anthology film, it features Adivi Sesh, Nikitha Narayan, Chaitanya Krishna, Kamal Kamaraju, Jasmin Bhasin, Mahat Raghavendra, Swathi Deekshith in pivotal roles. The film, produced by director Madhura Sreedhar Reddy along with MVK Reddy, released on 30 January 2015 to positive response. It is the remake of the 2012 thriller, Login.

Cast
 Adivi Sesh as Rahul
 Nikitha Narayan as Priya
 Chaitanya Krishna as Krishnamurthi
 Kamal Kamaraju as Anand
 Mahat Raghavendra as Vijay
 Swathi Deekshith as Deepa
 Jasmin Bhasin as Anjali

Critical reception
The Hindu wrote, "A lot of thought has gone into the screenplay and as the loose ends are tied up towards the end, it’s evident that many earlier sequences and supporting characters have all been there for a reason...Despite shortcomings, it’s commendable that the film doesn’t stick to the formula and play safe". The Times of India gave the film 3 stars out of 5 and wrote, "The film might not rank high in terms of visual aesthetics, but it does suck you into its twisted world where everyone seems to have an agenda of his own", further adding that while "the first half tests your patience", "the second half is riveting and everything falls in to place quite well in the third act". 123telugu.com gave 3 out of 5 as well and wrote, "Ladies and Gentleman is one film which is made with absolutely no commercial aspects. It is bold, concept driven and yet interesting". idlebrain.com gave 3.25 out of 5 and called it a "decently made film which is identifiable to all social media users".

References

2010s Telugu-language films
2015 films
Telugu remakes of Hindi films
2015 directorial debut films
Films scored by Raghu Kunche